William Downs may refer to:
 William Downs (artist), American artist
 William Missouri Downs, American comedy writer and playwright
 William B. Downs, American orthodontist
 Bill Downs, American broadcast journalist and war correspondent

See also
 William Downes (disambiguation)